Ricardo Migliorisi,  (January 6, 1948 – June 14, 2019)  born in Asunción, Paraguay, on January 6, 1948, to Isolina Salsa Ferraris and Salvador Migliorisi Tumino, of Italian origin. Migliorisi was a Paraguayan painter, costume designer, scenery designer and architect. Migliorisi won  national and international awards. Migliorisi showed his work in many countries including The United States of America and Europe.

Childhood and Youth 

He did his elementary studies at the Dante Aliglieri School and later on, at San José School, in Asunción.

His liking for the aesthetics and art were manifested at a young age and has made to mature the soul of this artist. His first artistic expressions came up when he was eighteen years old

When young, studied Plastic Arts in the Cira Moscarda Studio. In that studio many young people could give free hand to their creativity, expressed with inedited elements. The experience he lived there, gives him the impulse to come out as a transgressor in all his work.

Ricardo also studied engraving with the expert Livio Abramo, but basically he can be considered autodidactic.

Later on, he studied Architecture in the Universidad Nacional de Asunción (National University of Asuncion).

In the following years of his formation as an artist he gained much experience in many Latin-American countries, working as a wardrobe and scenery designer.

In the beginning he used drawing and painting in most of his work, but later included different other types of elements to his creations.

In a short period of time, the young artist showed the world an innovator, psychedelic and delirious style in his work.

Trajectory 

Ricardo Migliorisi appears in the Paraguayan artistic society in the mid ‘60s, a time marked by the urgent actualization and opening, by the emerging novelty in the field of Modernism, that invaded all the artistic societies in America and Europe.

He has had numerous opportunities to show his work:

Also, collective expositions with contemporary artists:

Awards 

During his career he received many awards.

Museums and collections 

His artistic production traveled numerous exposition rooms. Some of them are:
 Contemporary Arts Museum. Madrid, Spain.
 Modern Arts Museum. National University of Bogota, Colombia.
 ”Gabriel Turbay” Library. Bucaramanga, Colombia.
 Museum of Zea. Medellín, Colombia.
 Coltejer Collection. Medellín, Colombia.
 Culture House. Cúcuta, Colombia.
 Paraguayan Museum of Contemporary Arts. Asunción, Paraguay.
 ”The Sistine Tent”. Visual Arts Center. Asunción, Paraguay.
 Contemporary Arts Museum. Maldonado, Uruguay.
 ”José Luís Cuevas” Museum. Mexico.
Private collections in Spain, USA, Venezuela, Uruguay, Argentina, Mexico, Italy, Brazil, Peru, Sweden, Japan, Honduras, El Salvador, Colombia, France, Ecuador, Chile, Netherlands, Germany and Paraguay.

Style 

A very particular style, with an ample variety of expressive resources, paintings, montages, audio-visual experiences and installations are part of his work.

His characters are considered none too realistic, and may represent popular Latin-American subjects, animals and classic mythology, opera, circus and cabaret characters, the television and socialite, all of them with crazy tendencies.

Migliorisi presents a strong scenic sense, binding his creations to theatrical spaces. In his characters there is the mystery of the masks and the shine of footlight. The way he uses the color is a remarkable characteristic, the contrast, transparencies and textures give live to mud or metal objects. Emerge imposing plaster figures, woods of feather, glass pearls and golden stones and caracoles.

His family 
His family, of Italian descent, lives in Asunción. He has a sister: María Cristina Migliorisi de Galiano.

Migliorisi was hospitalized in May 2019 under intensive therapy. He died on June 14, 2019, at the age of 71.

References 

  Escobar, Ticio y Amigo, Roberto . “Ricardo Migliorisi”. Centro de Artes visuales. Arte Nuevo. 2002. Asunción.

External links 
 Enciclopedia Encarta
 Iberoamérica pinta

1948 births
2019 deaths
Paraguayan people of Italian descent
Paraguayan painters
Universidad Nacional de Asunción alumni
Paraguayan architects
People from Asunción